Mark A. Nelson (born 1953) is an artist whose work has appeared in role-playing games and comic books. Nelson's style has been described as "carefully articulated".

Biography 
Nelson attended the Cleveland Institute of Art and received his M.A. from the University of Michigan. He taught at Northern Illinois University for twenty years. One of his students was Tom Baxa.

From the late 1990s to the mid-2000s, Nelson worked for Raven Software doing conceptual work, painting digital skins, and creating textures for computer games. During this period, he was an animation instructor at Madison Area Technical College. Nelson was art director/head concept artist at Pi Studios in Houston from 2008 to 2011. He now runs his own studio (along with his wife, Anita), Grazing Dinosaur Press.

Work

Illustrator 
Nelson has produced interior illustrations for many Dungeons & Dragons books and Dragon magazine since 1985. He has also produced artwork for other games including Villains and Vigilantes (Fantasy Games Unlimited), Earthdawn and Shadowrun (FASA), and Orpheus (White Wolf), and illustrated cards for the Magic: The Gathering collectible card game.

Comics 
Nelson has worked extensively in the comics industry since the mid-1980s, for publishers such as NOW Comics, First Comics, Eclipse Comics, Dark Horse Comics, Marvel Comics, DC Comics, and Kitchen Sink Press. His comic book work includes the series Aliens. He contributed to the magazine Hero Illustrated.

Nelson illustrated the cover of Joe R. Lansdale's novel Blood Dance.

Nelson has made numerous contributions to Eureka Productions' Graphic Classics series, including H.P. Lovecraft, Jack London, Ambrose Bierce, Bram Stoker, Horror Classics, O. Henry, Adventure Classics, Fantasy Classics, and Native American Classics. He has also illustrated stories in Eureka's Rosebud #18 and The Best of Rosebud.

Instructional Books
Nelson authored Fantasy World-Building: A Guide to Developing Mythic Worlds and Legendary Creatures published through Dover Publications in 2019.

References

External links
 

1953 births
American comics artists
Living people
Northern Illinois University faculty
Role-playing game artists
University of Michigan alumni